Fairlawn may refer to:

Places in the United States (by state)
 Fairlawn, Florida 
Fairlawn (Lexington, Kentucky), listed on the National Register of Historic Places in Fayette County, Kentucky
 Fairlawn, Massachusetts 
Fairlawn (Worcester, Massachusetts), listed on the National Register of Historic Places in Worcester County, Massachusetts
 Fairlawn, Nevada
 Fairlawn, Ohio
 Fairlawn, Pennsylvania 
 Fairlawn, Rhode Island 
Fairlawn, Pulaski County, Virginia
Fairlawn, Covington, Virginia, a neighborhood in the independent city of Covington, Virginia
 Fairlawn (Washington, D.C.), a neighborhood of Washington, D.C.

See also
 Fair Lawn (disambiguation)